Naanu Naane is a 2002 Indian Kannada-language film directed by D. Rajendra Babu starring Upendra and Sakshi Shivanand. It is a remake of the Hindi film Raja Hindustani.

Cast 
 Upendra
 Sakshi Shivanand
 Ananthnag
 Pavitra Lokesh
 Sadhu Kokila
 Kovai Sarala
 Ramesh Bhat
 Ramya Krishna

Soundtrack
The music was composed by Deva and released by Magnasound Records. The songs "Pardesi Jaana Nahi" and "Aaye Ho Meri" from the original Hindi film have been retained here.

References 

2002 films
2000s Kannada-language films
Kannada remakes of Hindi films
Films scored by Deva (composer)
Films directed by D. Rajendra Babu